SeeYa (Hangul: 씨야) is a South Korean girl group originally made up of Kim Yeon-ji, Lee Bo-ram, and Nam Gyu-ri. When the group debuted in 2006, they were marketed as the female version of SG Wannabe. SeeYa were known for their 2007 hit song "Love's Greetings", and won Best Female Group at the Mnet Asian Music Awards that same year. In 2009, Nam Gyu-ri left the group to pursue a solo career and Lee Soo-mi replaced her for only one year. The group later remained as a duo with Kim Yeon-ji and Lee Bo-ram prior to disbandment in 2011.

History

2006–2007: The First Mind, Lovely Sweet Heart and promoting 
SeeYa's debut album, "The First Mind", was released on February 24, 2006, and was launched with the singles "A Woman's Scent" and "Shoes". The group also released a song did the soundtrack of drama The Invisible Man. SeeYa's first album was met with instant success in the Korean music industry. Their second album, "Lovely Sweet Heart", was released on May 25, 2007. The album sold over 81,00 copies in 2007, making it the fifth best-selling album in Korea that year. Their first single, "Love's Greeting", won awards at the 2007 Golden Disk Awards and the MKMF Awards.

2008: California Dream and several collaborations 
In January 2008, SeeYa released California Dream, an album which included songs that had been individually released as side-projects. Their album also included three new songs, including the single "Sad Footsteps", which was first released online in December 2007 and topped the charts. On January 31, SeeYa won the "Main Award" at the 2008 Seoul Music Awards. SeeYa collaborated with their label-mates Davichi and Black Pearl in May, creating a project group called Color Pink. The groups released a single together, which was entitled "Blue Moon." Seeya released their third album in September 2008 with an "electronica" song as the lead single, a contrast to the ballads the group had been known for. During promotions for the album, the group addressed the perception that the group was mainly a vehicle for raising Nam Gyu-ri's celebrity profile.

2009: Nam Gyu-ri's departure, Lee Soomi joins Seeya, Rebloom 
In April 2009, Core Contents Media announced that Nam Gyu-ri had stopped participating in the group's activities and that it might take legal action against her. Nam claimed that her contract was over and she was no longer bound to the company. A month after the controversy between Nam and the record label, SeeYa formed a project group with Davichi and T-ara to release the single "Women's Generation". During a press conference at the music video shoot for the song, SeeYa members Kim Yeon-ji and Lee Bo-ram acknowledged that they were disappointed by the manner of Nam's departure. Lee argued that the whole group revolved around Nam's wishes and emphasized that the members had received an advance for a contract of five years. "Women's Generation" topped the Korean mobile charts for four consecutive weeks, and was ranked #4 in mobile downloads for 2009. Core Contents Media announced that Nam had permanently left the group on August 13, 2009. Nam stated in a press release that she had left the group to focus on her acting career and had no intention of returning. SeeYa then began the search for a new member, and Nam was replaced by Lee Soo-mi. The group's first release after Lee Soomi joined was the EP "Rebloom", which was released on October 28, 2009.

2010–2011: Lee Soomi's departure, Nam Gyu-ri returns, See You Again, and Disbandment 
In January 2010, SeeYa teamed up with Davichi and T-ara once more for the release of the song "Wonder Woman". Several months later SeeYa released "Touch My Heart" for the soundtrack of the drama Personal Taste. In July, Core Contents Media announced that Lee Soo-mi would leave SeeYa to join the company's new group Coed School. SeeYa briefly continued as a duo made up of original members Kim Yeon-ji and Lee Bo-ram. In December 2010, Core Contents Media confirmed that SeeYa was going to disband after their next album release. The label claimed that the decision was made by the members, who wanted to go their separate ways. Kim Kwang Soo, the head of Core Contents Media, publicly called on Kim Yeon-ji to renew her contract with the label. However, some reports suggested that the label head's interview was a bad faith effort to hamper Kim Yeon-ji's future music career by making it more difficult for her to find a new label.

SeeYa released their final album on January 10, 2011. The compilation album was entitled "See You Again", and contained two new songs. Nam Gyu-ri decided to join her former members for the final promotions as a group. SeeYa disbanded after a final performance as a trio, on January 30, 2011, at Inkigayo.

In November 2012, Core Contents Media debuted a new group based on the SeeYa, which is named The SeeYa.

2020: Brief reunion
The group (Nam Gyu-ri, Kim Yeon-ji, Lee Bo-ram) made an appearance on JTBC's Two Yoo Project Sugar Man Season 3 on February 21, 2020. Lee Bo-ram's agency then revealed that the group will make a comeback in 2020.

Discography

Studio albums

Extended plays

Awards

References

South Korean girl groups
South Korean contemporary R&B musical groups
MBK Entertainment artists
Musical groups disestablished in 2011
Musical groups established in 2006
2006 establishments in South Korea
2011 disestablishments in South Korea
MAMA Award winners